Yulia Lytvynenko (born 7 November 1976 in Inhulets), is a Ukrainian television host and politician from Kryvyi Rih, Dnipropetrovsk Oblast.

Biography
She graduated from the Department of Journalism of Dnipropetrovsk State University. Until 1999 Lytvynenko worked as a stringer for 1+1 and STB as well as the local regional TV network of the Dnipropetrovsk Oblast.

In 1999 to 2000, she was hosting Question of the day program on the UT-1. From 2001 to 2003 - an anchor lady on the news program Facts at ICTV.

Since 2004, leads the TV project Pozaochi (Behind the eyes) first on K1, then on Inter (2008).

In 2009, Lytvynenko became a co-leader of the concert show Place of meeting on Inter. She also competed on the TV-game show BUM for the Dnipropetrovsk Oblast.

In 2008, Lytvynenko also was a co-leader on the political TV-forum Svoboda na Intere, which later was replaced with the Big Politics with Yevgeniy Kiselev.

Litvinenko officially became a presidential candidate in February 2019. In this election, she did not proceed to the second round of the election; in the first round she gained 0.10% of the votes.

She has a daughter Oleksandra.

See also
 Inter (TV channel)

References

 Profile on Inter
 Profile at kino-teatr.ru
 Interview to happywoman.com.ua
 Interview to Facts and Commentaries
 Photo her at podrobnosti.ua

1976 births
Living people
Politicians from Kryvyi Rih
Oles Honchar Dnipro National University alumni
Ukrainian television presenters
Ukrainian television journalists
Ukrainian women journalists
Candidates in the 2019 Ukrainian presidential election
21st-century Ukrainian politicians
21st-century Ukrainian women politicians
Ukrainian women television presenters
Mass media people from Kryvyi Rih